Kill GAA (An Chill GAA) is a Gaelic Athletic Association club in Kill, County Kildare, Ireland. They combined with Ardclough to form area side Wolfe Tones in the 1970s.

History
RIC records from 1890 show that Kilteel King O'Tooles club had 30 members with officers listed as John Lennon, John Buggle, William Walsh and William Dowling.

Gaelic Football
Kill won the Junior A & B Championship on the same day in 1992, and won the Higgins Cup final against Eadestown. As a result, Kill was named 1992 Kildare Club Of The Year. In Intermediate ranks the following year they lost to Rathcoffey in the Northern final. They maintained their Intermediate status since 1993, having close calls in 2012 (v. Straffan), 2013 (v. Kilcullen) 2014 (v. Robertstown) & 2015 (v. Caragh) where they won all four relegation finals in a row, before finally being relegated in the Junior championship in 2019 against Ellistown.

In the 1962 Kildare Senior Football Championship Kill reached the semi-final stage, their best finish to date. Olly Harrington scored their goal as they went down to Kilcullen, 1-7 to 1-5. Area side Wolfe Tones qualified for the 1971 senior football semi-final and a three-point defeat to Carbury. The current players have improved greatly over the last few years, but have been suffering dearly at the hands of bigger clubs in recent history.

Hurling
Kill hurlers began contesting the Junior Championship in the 1950s. They won the Division 3 Hurling League in 2001, followed by the Division 2 Hurling league in 2002.

Kill also contested the Junior championship finals of 2002, 2003, 2004, before finally winning it in 2005 with a last second goal by Brian McMahon, winning by a point over Leixlip. They followed this by reaching the Intermediate Championship Final in 2006, losing narrowly to Ardclough.
By reaching the Intermediate final, they then went on to represent Kildare in the 2006 Leinster Junior Club Hurling Championship against Our Lady's Island from Wexford. More silverware followed in 2011, when they again went on to win the Intermediate B Championship by one point, beating a heavily fancied Confey team on a scoreline of 1-8 to 2-6.

Kill amalginated with Ardclough to form Killard for minor in 2008, winning the 2008 Kildare Minor 'A' Hurling Championship beating Naas in Leixlip 0-12 to 0-8. Also winning the Kildare under 16 'B' in 2009 beating Maynooth in Clane.

Camogie
Kill Camogie team have the club's sole Senior Championship title, winning the 1957 championship. They completed a league & championship double in 2018, winning the Division 2 League final versus Cappagh GAA & Intermediate Championship final versus a Rathcoffey/Straffan amalgamation.

Kill hosted the 1939 Leinster final in a field behind the church where the dual carriageway now runs.

Honours
Champions
 1957	Camogie	        Senior Championship
 2018	Camogie	        Intermediate Camogie Championship
 2018	Camogie	        Senior Division 2 League Champions
 2017	Camogie	        Junior League 2 Champions 
 2009	Camogie	        Junior B Champions 
 2008	Camogie	        Junior B Champions
 1960, 1979, 1992	Football	Junior A  Championship
 1992	Football	Junior B Championship
 2007	Football	Div. 3 Champions
 2018	LGFA	        Junior Championship
 2011	Hurling	        Intermediate B Hurling Championship
 2005	Hurling         Junior Championship (1) 
 2021	Football	    Reserve League Div. 5 Champions
 2021	Football	    Reserve E Football Championship Champions

Underage
 2009	Hurling	        Under-16 B Championship  (with Ardclough as Killard)* 2004	Football	U10 A, North Board Spring League
 2006	Hurling	        Minor A Championship (with Ardclough as Killard)
 2006	Camogie	        U12 Camogie Winners
 2005	Football	U14 Feile B 
 2004	Football	U11 North Board Spring League
 2003	Football	U9 B, North Board Spring League  
 2003	Football	Minor B Championship (with Eadestown as CillEide)  
 2004	Football	U21 B Championship (with Eadestown as CillEide)  
 2021	Football	Minor D Championship
 2022	Football	Minor Div. 4 Champions
 2022	Football	Minor D Championship		

Finalist		
 1962	Football	Senior Championship Semi-finalists 
 2001	Hurling	        Div. 3 League   
 2002	Hurling	        Div. 2 League   
 2006	Hurling	        Intermediate Championship  Runner-Up 
 2007	Football	U14 Feile B  
 2016	Camogie	        U15 Div 2 Finalist  
 2016	Camogie	        U13 Shield Finalist   
 2017	Camogie	        Intermediate Finalists 
 2017	Football	Minor D  Championship Runner Up 2017 (with Ardclough as Killard) 
 2017	Camogie	        U15 Shield Finalist 
 2018	Football	U12 Shield Finalist
 2021	Football	Senior Football League Division 4 Finalist
 2022	Football	U17 Div. 3 Finalists
 2022	Football	Junior Championship Finalist

Bibliography
 Kildare GAA: A Centenary History, by Eoghan Corry, CLG Chill Dara, 1984,  hb  pb
 Kildare GAA yearbook, 1972, 1974, 1978, 1979, 1980 and 2000- in sequence especially the Millennium yearbook of 2000
 Soaring Sliothars: Centenary of Kildare Camogie 1904-2004 by Joan O'Flynn Kildare County Camogie Board.

External links
Kill GAA Website
Kill GAA on Facebook
Kildare GAA site
Kildare GAA club sites
Kildare on Hoganstand.com

Gaelic games clubs in County Kildare
Gaelic football clubs in County Kildare